Vincent William Shoobridge (4 July 1872 – 5 August 1948) was an Australian politician.

He was born in Bushy Park, the son of William Shoobridge, also a politician. In 1940 he was elected to the Tasmanian House of Assembly as a Nationalist member for Franklin in a recount following George Doyle's death. He was defeated in 1941. Shoobridge died in 1948 in Hobart.

References

1872 births
1948 deaths
Nationalist Party of Australia members of the Parliament of Tasmania
Members of the Tasmanian House of Assembly